The 2022–23 Providence Friars Men's ice hockey season is the 72nd season of play for the program. They represent Providence College in the 2022–23 NCAA Division I men's ice hockey season and for the 39th season in the Hockey East conference. The Friars are coached by Nate Leaman, in his 11th season, play their home games at Schneider Arena.

Season

Departures

Recruiting

Roster
As of August 22, 2022.

|}

Standings

Schedule and results

|-
!colspan=12 style=";" | Exhibition

|-
!colspan=12 style=";" | Regular Season

|-
!colspan=12 style=";" | 

|-
!colspan=12 style=";" | Regular Season

|-
!colspan=12 style=";" |

Scoring statistics

Goaltending statistics

Rankings

USCHO did not release a poll in weeks 1 and 13.

References

2022-23
Providence Friars
Providence Friars
Providence Friars
Providence Friars